The Tractate Middoth is a supernatural television drama produced by the BBC. First broadcast on BBC Two on 25 December 2013 and running at 36 minutes,  it was based on The Tractate Middoth, a short ghost story by the British academic and author M. R. James which was first published in 1911 in his More Ghost Stories, James's second collection of ghost stories. The television drama was adapted and directed by Mark Gatiss as part of the long-running A Ghost Story for Christmas series.

Synopsis

Mary Simpson (Louise Jameson) is called to the deathbed of her clergyman uncle, Dr Rant (David Ryall), at his imposing home, Bretfield Manor. She arrives just as her cousin, John Eldred, is leaving. Rant tells Mary there is something she must know. 

Twenty years later William Garrett (Sacha Dhawan), a student working part-time at a university library, is sent by the library attendant ‘Sniffer’ Hodgson (Roy Barraclough) to search for a Mishnaic tractate for an impatient library patron named John Eldred (John Castle). Eldred is strangely reluctant to fetch the book himself, and seems to recognise and is afraid of the swirling dust at the far end of the library. While searching for the book Garrett encounters a black-clad clergyman (Paul Warren) who also seems interested in the book. As the clergyman turns Garrett sees him - his head is enshrouded in cobwebs and he smells of mould and dust – which vision causes Garrett a severe shock and he faints.  He is sent home to recover and is persuaded by his friend George Earle (Nick Burns) to recuperate at the seaside.

On the train to his destination Garrett meets the comical Miss Chambers (Una Stubbs). He is met at the station by the impoverished widow Mary Simpson and her daughter Anne (Charlie Clemmow), who are forced to take in "ruddy lodgers" to make ends meet.  The Simpsons confide in him that they are losing a struggle with a rival heir to the estate of her deceased uncle, an unpleasant clergyman named Dr Thomas Rant. She explains, "I had an old uncle, a Dr Rant. He wasn't a distinguished man. And not a nice one, either. He was a priest. Though I'm sure I don’t know how he got to be one. He never did any duties, as far as I could tell, in the late part of his life. And he wasn’t what you'd call 'Christian' in his ways. He hadn't any wife, or family, only one niece, that's me, and one nephew, my cousin John. But he didn't really like either of us." On his deathbed Rant had told Mary Simpson that he had left his considerable estate to his nephew John Eldred - but tells her there is a later will leaving everything to her - if she has the wits to find it. He gives her the clue that the will is in English, though she won’t recognise it as such, and is hidden in a printed book elsewhere. He passes her a further clue - a slip of paper on which is written ‘11334’. At the funeral Rant's former housekeeper Mrs Goundry (Eleanor Bron) warns Mary Simpson, "Twisted, 'e was. Twisted. Where others 'ave a soul, 'e 'ad a corkscrew. Don’t trust 'im ... in life or death." As they describe the situation, Garrett realizes that the man at the library is John Eldred - the rival heir. The tractate supposedly contains the hidden secret will that would supersede the earlier last will and testament. Garrett decides to help the Simpsons by preventing Eldred from destroying this document.

Returning to the library, Garrett realised that '11334' is the catalogue number for the copy of the Tractate Middoth that Eldred had been so interested in. He finds that the tractate has been sent by train to Eldred at Bretfield Manor. Following the book in the next train, he arrives too late to stop Eldred from collecting the parcel. Garrett stalks Eldred through the countryside, and as Eldred sits on a stile to open the book to tear out and destroy the will a strange black spot appears on the page before him and spreads. The black hand of the awful dark figure of Rant reaches out for the face of Eldred, as spiders run about the heavy cobwebs on Rant's dead and twisted face. Eldred drops dead. An inquest finds the cause of his death is heart failure. The tractate becomes evidence. When it appears that Eldred had been tearing out a page when he died, the missing will is discovered and decrypted, written in a coded script that looks like Hebrew but is actually in English. By its terms, Mrs. Simpson inherits the estate formerly possessed by Eldred. Garrett and her daughter marry, and as the newly weds enter the property an ominous dusty shadow is in the doorway behind them - as a spider follows them in.

Cast
Sacha Dhawan .. William Garrett
John Castle .. John Eldred
Louise Jameson .. Mary Simpson
Charlie Clemmow .. Anne Simpson
Una Stubbs .. Miss Chambers
David Ryall .. Dr Rant
 Paul Warren .. Rant's ghost 
Eleanor Bron .. Mrs Goundry
Nick Burns .. George Earle
Roy Barraclough .. Hodgson

Adaptation
Gatiss says the story is one of his favourite M. R. James tales and decided to set his version in the 1950s. He created the character of Garrett's  eccentric fellow traveller Miss Chambers (Una Stubbs), who he encounters on the train to the seaside town where he hopes to recuperate from his shock in the library. In a 2013 interview recorded for the British Film Institute Gatiss said that, despite his desire to be faithful to and "honour" the original, there was no reason for Dr Rant to come back as a ghost and behave the way it did in the story, so he created the character of the housekeeper Mrs Goundry (Eleanor Bron) to emphasise the “twisted” character of Rant. He changed the happy ending of the original to something more ominous.

On being refused permission to use dust during the appearances of the spectre of Dr Rant in Chetham's Library the production instead used bulrushes to create the swirling effect.

Locations

Locations in the drama included Chetham's Library in Manchester, and Browsholme Hall, Cow Ark in Lancashire, which stood in as Bretfield Manor. Scenes were also filmed at Stonyhurst College, where students in 1950s costumes appeared as background artists. This featured as the university buildings housing the library.

References

External links

Adaptations of works by M. R. James
BBC television dramas
Television shows based on short fiction
A Ghost Story for Christmas
2013 television films